The Wild Magnolias are a Mardi Gras Indian tribe who also record and play as a funk musical act from New Orleans, Louisiana.

History

Origins 
A group calling itself the Wild Magnolias, participating in the local "Indian masking" traditions and performing New Orleans Mardi Gras music, extends at least back into the 1950s. The group's lead member was called the Big Chief, and at least three Big Chiefs are known to have headed the band for short stints prior to 1964: Leon, Flap, and Joe Lee Davis.

In 1964, Bo Dollis became Big Chief of the group, having previously participated in other Mardi Gras tribes such as the White Eagles and the Golden Arrows.

1970s: Commercial peak 
In 1970, the group cut a 45rpm single for Crescent City Records entitled "Handa Wanda," recorded and mixed by Cy Frost at Deep South Recording Studio. That year they also performed at the first New Orleans Jazz & Heritage Festival, along with Monk Boudreaux of the Golden Eagles Mardi Gras Indian tribe. In addition to their usual ensemble of vocalist and a battery of percussion instruments (snares, tom toms, cymbals, beer bottles, cans, and so forth), the group culled together a number of local musicians, including pianist Willie Tee and guitarist Snooks Eaglin, as their backing band, called the New Orleans Project. The single received little airplay on radio but was successful in jukeboxes and through local word-of-mouth. On the strength of the single, the group signed with Barclay Records, a French label, and secured distribution of their albums in America with Polydor Records. Two critically acclaimed full-length albums followed, in 1974 and 1975, and a single, "Smoke My Peace Pipe (Smoke it Right)", cracked the Billboard Black Singles chart, peaking at #74 in 1974. Reviewing the 1974 Wild Magnolias LP in Christgau's Record Guide: Rock Albums of the Seventies (1981), Robert Christgau wrote:

At the height of the group's popularity, they booked dates at Carnegie Hall and the Capital Centre in Washington, D.C. Polydor elected not to release the second album stateside, which would not see release in America until 1993. The group returned to New Orleans and local festivals.

1980s–2000s 
In the late 1980s, Allison Miner expressed interest in restarting the band's career, and booked them on new tours along with signing them to Rounder Records, who released an album of theirs, I'm Back...at Carnival Time (featuring the ReBirth Brass Band) in 1990. In 1992, the Magnolias toured Europe as part of Willy DeVille's "New Orleans Revue" (along with Dr John, Johnny Adams, and Zachary Richard). They can be heard on DeVille's album Big Easy Fantasy. They recorded an album for an Australian label in 1996, and in 1999 signed with Capitol Records subsidiary Metro Blue to release Life is a Carnival. With a permanent backing band, the group began embarking on worldwide tours.

In 2001, Boudreaux left the group as a result of disputes with the group's manager over guarantee payments.

In 2007, the group's two 1970s albums were re-released as a two-disc set with bonus materials on Sunny Side Records.

In 2011, Dollis was awarded a National Heritage Fellowship by the National Endowment for the Arts, which is the United States government's highest honor in the folk and traditional arts.

2013's New Kind of Funk LP marked the first Wild Magnolias record fronted by Dollis' son, Gerard "Bo Jr.," who also now serves as Big Chief of the tribe. The LP also brought Monk Boudreaux back into the Magnolias fold, following Dollis' successful reclamation of The Wild Magnolias' trademark from his former manager. Boudreaux continues to occasionally perform with the group.

Big Chief Bo Dollis died in January 2015.

Members
Current members

Norwood Johnson – percussion
Gerard "Little Bo" Dollis ("Big Chief") – vocals
Queen Rita – vocals

Former members
Theodore "Bo" Dollis ("Big Chief") – vocals, background vocals, tambourine
Monk Boudreaux – vocals, background vocals, congas
Billy Iuso – guitar
Joe Gelini - drums
June Yamagishi – guitar
Willie Tee – background vocals, keyboards, percussion 
Snooks Eaglin – guitar
Adam Crochet - guitar, vocals
Earl Turbinton, Jr. – soprano sax, alto sax, alto clarinet, bass clarinet
Alfred "Uganda" Roberts - congas
Tom Worrell - keys, vocals
Joseph "Zigaboo" Modeliste - drums
George French - electric bass
Bill Richards - electric bass, vocals
Julius Farmer – electric bass
Norwood "Geechie" Johnson - bass drum
June Johnson, Jr.
Washington "Bubba" Scott - background vocals, tambourine, triangle
Gator June - background vocals, tambourine
Crip Adams - background vocals, cowbell, tambourine
Johnny "Quarter Moon" Tobias - background vocals, tambourine, whistle
Tobias Johnson
Ervin Charles - electric bass
James Smothers - background vocals, bongos, congas
Larry Panna – drums
Leonard "Gate" Johnson – background vocals, tambourine
George "Little Georgie" Rossi – background vocals, piano

Discography
"Handa Wanda" 7" single (Crescent City, 1970)
The Wild Magnolias (Barclay/Polydor, 1974)
They Call Us Wild (Barclay, 1975)
I'm Back...at Carnival Time (Rounder, 1988)
Super Sunday Showdown (collaboration with Mardi Gras Indians and Dr. John, 1991)
1313 Hoodoo Street (AIM Records, 1996)
Life is a Carnival (Capitol/Metro Blue, 1999)
30 Years and Still Wild (Pony Canyon, 2002)
They Call Us Wild re-release (with The Wild Magnolias and bonus material, Sunnyside, 2007)
A New Kind of Funk (One More Time, 2013)
Wild Side(s): 2015-1991 (2015, independent release)

References

External links
Interview with Bo Dollis

Musical groups from New Orleans
American funk musical groups
Mardi Gras in New Orleans
Musical groups established in 1970
National Heritage Fellowship winners